Corinne Lagache  (born 9 December 1975 in Caen) is a French footballer who played as a goalkeeper for the France women's national football team. She was part of the team at the UEFA Women's Euro 2001. On club level she played for La Roche ESOF in France.

Carrier 
1997-2010 ES Cormelles (french:Entente sportive Cormelles-le-Royal)

1997-2010 La Roche ESOF (French: Etoile Sportive Ornaysienne de Football Vendée La Roche-sur-Yon)

References

External links
 
 

1975 births
Living people
French women's footballers
France women's international footballers
Footballers from Caen
Women's association football goalkeepers